The 1930 Ladies Open Championships was held at the Queen's Club, West Kensington in London from 20–25 January 1930. Nancy Cave won her third title defeating Cecily Fenwick in the final.

Draw and results

Qualifying round

Main draw

Notes
Miss Joyce Cave was injured and could not compete.

References

Women's British Open Squash Championships
Women's British Open Squash Championships
Women's British Open Squash Championships
Women's British Open Squash Championships
Squash competitions in London
Women's British Open Squash Championships